Duke of York Island may refer to:

 Duke of York Island, Antarctica
 Duke of York Islands, Papua New Guinea
 Duke of York Island, Papua New Guinea
 Duke of York Island (Chile) (Isla Duque de York)
 Etolin Island, Alaska, was named Duke of York Island until it became American territory with the Alaska Purchase of 1867

See also
 Duke of York Archipelago, Nunavut, Canada